Alfredo Gómez may refer to:

 Alfredo Gómez Urcuyo (born 1942), Nicaraguan politician
 Alfredo Gómez Sánchez (born 1968), Mexican politician